Woods Memorial Presbyterian Church was established in 1912 in Severna Park, Maryland. With more than 1,500-1,800 members, it is the largest congregation in the Baltimore Presbytery, and among the largest 1.02% of Presbyterian churches in the United States.

History
Woods Church was founded by eight organizing members in 1912. The pastor served the first six months without pay. The first church services were held in the local public elementary school. The first church building was financed with the help of a grant from the Baltimore Presbytery and a loan from the General Assembly through their new church development agencies. It was twenty-five years before the church reached a membership of about 150.

Global outreach

Meadowbrook Church in Jamaica
One of the church's most significant outreach activities has been its relationship with the Meadowbrook United Church of Kingston, Jamaica. This relationship began with a Presbytery sponsored Jamaican mission project started in 1984. Woods Church members took part in mission visits in 1985 and 1986. In 1986, Raymond Coke, the minister of Meadowbrook Church, proposed that the two churches develop a joint mission relationship after a visit to Woods. This led to an exchange of pulpits for a month in 1987.  After further visits by members of both congregations, agreements were reached on Woods' support of the catering and cooking school run by Meadowbrook. Later on, other support agreements were reached involving the elementary schools being run by Meadowbrook. Woods also provided some equipment for the Meadowbrook dental clinic.

Woods maintains this relationship with Meadowbrook as its sister church. Woods Church provides student scholarships annually for children in need at Meadowbrook Preparatory School.

References

http://www.severnaparkvoice.com/school-youth/woodswork-youth-thank-community-prepare-mission-trip

External links
Woods Memorial Presbyterian Church, Church website
Severna Park Community Center, Center website
Severna Park Assisted Living, Assisted Living Center website
Woods Child Development Center, Center website

Presbyterian churches in Maryland
Presbyterian Church (USA) churches
Churches in Anne Arundel County, Maryland
Severna Park, Maryland